Princess Pauline Olga Helene Emma of Württemberg (19 December 18777 May 1965) was the only child of William II of Württemberg and Princess Marie of Waldeck and Pyrmont to reach adulthood. Pauline was the wife of William Frederick, Prince of Wied, and worked for many years as the regional director of the German Red Cross in western Germany.

Early life
Pauline was born at Stuttgart in the Kingdom of Württemberg, the elder daughter of William II of Württemberg (1848–1921) by his first wife Princess Marie of Waldeck and Pyrmont (1857–1882). She became their only surviving child after the deaths of her brother Prince Ulrich and unnamed stillborn sister.

World War II
She was indicted for concealing, since October 1945, a pair of important Nazis by a military court of the United States. She confessed to knowingly sheltering Frau Gertrud Scholtz-Klink and her spouse, former SS Maj. General August Heissmayer.
The Princess was aware that Frau Scholtz-Klink was the head of the Nazi women's organizations, but she denied that she had been aware of Heissmayer's SS position.

Princess Pauline was bailed out of custody but scheduled for trial in March 1948. She stated that she came to know Frau Scholtz-Klink during the years when both women headed significant institutions under the Nazis, the Princess asserting that she had then been the director of the German Red Cross for Hesse, Nassau, the Rhineland and Westphalia.

Herr and Frau Scholtz-Klink informed the French that they asked for Princess Pauline's aid in 1945, Princess Pauline arranged for them to stay inconspicuously in Bebenhausen, where they were arrested by Allied authorities.

Marriage and family
Princess Pauline married on 29 October 1898 in Stuttgart to William Frederick, Prince of Wied (1872–1945), son of William, Prince of Wied and the spectacularly wealthy Princess Marie of the Netherlands. Her husband's elder brother was William, Prince of Albania, and she was a first cousin of the Dutch queen, Wilhelmina of the Netherlands.

They had 2 children:
Prince Hermann of Wied (18 August 1899 – 5 November 1941), married Countess Marie Antonia von Stolberg-Wernigerode, and had issue, including Friedrich Wilhelm, Prince of Wied, who married Princess Guda, daughter of Josias, Hereditary Prince of Waldeck and Pyrmont.
Prince Dietrich of Wied (30 October 1901 – 8 June 1976), married Countess Antoinette Julia von Grote, and had issue. The Countess was a niece of Countess Thyra von Grote, who married German diplomat Martin Rücker von Jenisch, in 1905, She was also a niece of American expatriate Harry Van Bergen and a granddaughter of businessman Anthony T. Van Bergen.

Descendants
Through Prince Dietrich, she was a grandmother of Otto Hermann Maximilien, Prince of Wied (1929–2008), Ulrich, Prince of Wied (1931–2010), and Thierry Louis-Eugène, Prince of Wied (1938–2001). Her grandson Ulrich married Ilke Fischer in 1968 and was the mother of Ulrich, Prince of Wied (b. 1970), who married Clarissa Elizabeth Makepeace-Massingham (b. 1971) in 2000; and Marie, Princess of Wied (b. 1973), who married Duke Friedrich of Württemberg (1961–2018), eldest son of Carl, Duke of Württemberg and heir to the House of Württemberg, in 1993. Duke Friedrich died in a car accident in 2018 and his funeral was attended by King Philippe and Queen Mathilde of Belgium, Hans-Adam II, Prince of Liechtenstein, and Bernhard, Hereditary Prince of Baden.

Ancestry

References

External links

The Royal House of Stuart, London, 1969, 1971, 1976, Addington, A. C., Reference: 218
L'Allemagne dynastique, Huberty, Giraud, Magdelaine, Reference: II 547 ; III 74

1877 births
1965 deaths
Nobility from Stuttgart
House of Wied-Neuwied
Princesses of Württemberg
Daughters of kings